Dayle Haddon (born May 26, 1948) is a Canadian model and actress, presently known for promoting anti-aging products manufactured by L'Oréal. Additionally, she is credited as author of Ageless Beauty: A Woman's Guide to Lifelong Beauty and Well-Being.

During the earlier part of her career as a model, Haddon appeared on the covers of many top fashion and beauty magazines, as well as the cover of the Sports Illustrated Swimsuit Issue in 1973. Haddon also served as a wellness contributor to CBS News where she appeared regularly on The Early Show from 2005 to 2008.

Biography
Born and raised in Montreal, Quebec, Canada, Haddon speaks both English and French. As a child, she was enrolled in dancing classes to develop her physique, and she performed well enough to become a member of Les Grands Ballets Canadiens at 13, and was chosen Miss Montreal at 18. Haddon is Jewish.

As a model in the 1970s and 1980s, Haddon represented Max Factor, Revlon, Estée Lauder, and L'Oréal. She appeared on the cover of the Sports Illustrated Swimsuit Issue in 1973 (January 29) and was twice named to Harper's Bazaar'''s "Ten Most Beautiful Women." She also appeared nude in the April 1973 issue of Playboy.

Haddon worked as an actress, appearing in the Disney movie The World's Greatest Athlete (1973) with Jan-Michael Vincent. She moved to Europe, continued modeling and acting, and appeared in a number of film roles in French and English, as well as occasional small parts in American movies.  Her best known roles were in Madame Claude (1977), and North Dallas Forty (1979) opposite actor Nick Nolte.

Haddon was originally cast for the role of Dale Arden in the 1980 film version of Flash Gordon, but producer Dino De Laurentiis replaced her with Melody Anderson just before filming commenced.

During Haddon's tenure as a main face for L'Oréal, sales for the Age Perfect line have increased by 50%. According to The New York Times, Dayle has "shattered age taboos" with her multiyear contracts with L'Oréal and Estée Lauder, among other companies.

Personal life
Clairol selected her as a spokesperson, and she later broke barriers for women over the age of 35 when she became the global face of a new anti-aging line for Estée Lauder, a first in the beauty industry.  On the day that her Estée Lauder contract expired L'Oréal signed her. She now has her own company, Dayle Haddon Concepts Inc.  In early 2008 she was named a UNICEF ambassador.

Haddon is also the founder of a non-profit called WomenOne. The organization's motto is "changing the world one woman at a time."

Through WomenOne, Haddon has partnered with Free The Children, an international charity, to provide scholarships for girls’ education in Kenya. Through her organization, she has raised and donated more than $150,000 for one of Free The Children's all-girls secondary schools.

Haddon has also appeared as the face of a line of socially and environmentally responsible accessories launched by Me to We, Free The Children's partner organization.

She is the mother of Ryan Haddon.

Filmography
 Paperback Hero (1973) .... Joanna
 The World's Greatest Athlete (1973) .... Jane Douglas
 The Cousin (1974) .... Agata
 Gambling City (1975) .... Maria Luisa
 Substitute Teacher  (1975) .... Sonia
 Spermula (1976) .... Spermula
 Sex with a Smile (1976) .... Marina (segment "The Bodyguard")
 Madame Claude (1977) .... Elizabeth
 Maschio latino cercasi (1977) .... The Lawyer
 Dernier amant romantique, Le (1978) .... Elisabeth
 North Dallas Forty (1979) .... Charlotte Caulder
 Disneyland aka Disney's Wonderful World  (1983) .... Suzy Thomson, alias D'Annunzio
 Paroles et Musique (1984) .... Corinne
 Bedroom Eyes (1984) .... Alex
 The Hitchhiker (1986) TV Episode .... Debby Hunt
 Roses de Matmata, Les (1986) .... Diane Collins
 Max Headroom (1987) TV Episode .... Vanna Smith
 Zwei Frauen (1989) .... Darlene Meyers
 Cyborg (1989) .... Pearl Prophet
 Tropical Gamble (1990) .... Helen
 Unbecoming Age (1992) .... Susan
 Bullets Over Broadway (1994) .... Backstage Well-Wisher
 Fiesta (1995) .... Cecilia Harrington-Forbes
 Tilt-A-Whirl (1995) .... Mother
 Celebrity'' (1998) .... Waiting Room Patient

References

External links
U.S. News & World Report on Haddon's work with UNICEF
CNN interview with Haddon about UNICEF
masterplanneronline 

Anglophone Quebec people
Canadian film actresses
Canadian television actresses
Actresses from Montreal
UNICEF Goodwill Ambassadors
Living people
Female models from Quebec
1948 births
20th-century Canadian actresses
Models from Montreal